Simon Marandi was an Indian politician. He was elected to the Lok Sabha, the lower house of the Parliament of India from Rajmahal as a member of the Jharkhand Mukti Morcha from 1989 to 1996.

Political career 
He was elected to Bihar Legislative Assembly in 1977 by defeating the then incumbent Marang Murmu by 149 votes from Litipara. He won Litipara in 1980 Bihar Legislative Assembly election, 1985 Bihar Legislative Assembly election, 2009 Jharkhand Legislative Assembly election at Litipara. He was Minister of Rural Development in first Hemant Soren ministry from 13 July 2013 to 28 December 2014.
In 2014, he joined Bharatiya Janata Party and contested in Littipara but lost to Dr. Anil Murmu of Jharkhand Mukti Morcha but for 2017 by-election, Maradi returned to Jharkhand Mukti Morcha and won the seat. 
In 2019, Dinesh William Marandi contested the polls in 2019 Jharkhand Legislative Assembly election after Marandi sidelined himself due to ill health.

Controversy 
On 12 December 2017, the Bharatiya Janata Party called for Marandi's suspension from the Jharkhand Legislative Assembly for organizing a kissing contest for tribal couples in Pakur.

Personal life 
He married Sushila Hansda and had a daughter and son Dinesh William Marandi who won the 2019 Jharkhand Legislative Assembly election from Litipara.

In April 2021, he died of a cardiac ailment at Rabindranath Tagore Hospital, Kolkata, West Bengal at age of 73.

References

External links
Official biographical sketch in Parliament of India website

1947 births
2021 deaths
Jharkhand Mukti Morcha politicians
Bharatiya Janata Party politicians from Jharkhand
Lok Sabha members from Bihar
India MPs 1989–1991
India MPs 1991–1996